Naya Ishwar Ko Ghoshana is a Nepali epic by Gopal Parajuli. It was published in 2004 by Antarastriya Nepali Sahitya Samaj (International Nepali Literary Society) and won the prestigious Madan Puraskar for the year 2060 BS.

Synopsis 
The epic is divided into two sections. Each section consists of 98 paragraphs. The poem is written in modern experimental style.

Reception 
The book won the Madan Puraskar, one of the most foremost Nepali literary award. It also won the INLS Best Book Award.

Translation 
The book was translated into English as Declaration of a New God by Dr. Govinda Raj Bhattarai in 2008.

See also 

 Dhritarashtra
 Muna Madan
 Gauri

References 

2004 poetry books
21st-century Nepalese books
Nepalese epics
Madan Puraskar-winning works
Nepali-language books